Ahsan Raza (born 29 May 1974 in Lahore, Pakistan) is a Pakistani cricket umpire and former cricketer. In November 2020, in the second Twenty20 International (T20I) between Pakistan and Zimbabwe, he stood in his 50th T20I match as an on-field umpire, becoming the first umpire to reach the milestone in T20I cricket.

Playing career
Ahsan Raza played for a number of Pakistani teams including Faisalabad, Habib Bank Limited, Lahore and Sargodha.

Umpiring career
Ahsan Raza is Pakistan's nominated third umpire on the International Cricket Council International Panel of Umpires and Referees. Ahsan Raza made his debut as a first-class umpire in 2006 and had umpired 35 matches to the end of February 2009. He got a contract from Pakistan Cricket Board (PCB) along with Zameer Haider and Shozab Raza in 2012.

In January 2018, he was named as one of the seventeen on-field umpires for the 2018 Under-19 Cricket World Cup. In October 2018, he was named as one of the twelve on-field umpires for the 2018 ICC Women's World Twenty20. In October 2019, he was appointed as one of the twelve umpires to officiate matches in the 2019 ICC T20 World Cup Qualifier tournament in the United Arab Emirates.

In February 2020, the ICC named him as one of the umpires to officiate in matches during the 2020 ICC Women's T20 World Cup in Australia. Raza was also named as one of the two on-field umpires for the final of the tournament. In December 2020, he was shortlisted as one of the Umpire of the Year for the 2020 PCB Awards.

In January 2021, he umpired in his first Test match, for Pakistan's home matches against South Africa.

In March 2023, Raza and Adrian Holdstock from South Africa were inducted in the Elite Panel of ICC Umpires after Aleem Dar left the panel.

Attack

On 3 March 2009, Ahsan Raza was injured in an attack on the Sri Lankan cricket team in Lahore. He was shot twice and was in a serious condition in a Lahore hospital.

See also
 List of Test cricket umpires
 List of One Day International cricket umpires
 List of Twenty20 International cricket umpires

References

External links

1974 births
Pakistani cricket umpires
Pakistani Test cricket umpires
Pakistani One Day International cricket umpires
Pakistani Twenty20 International cricket umpires
Living people
Punjabi people
Pakistani cricketers
Faisalabad cricketers
Habib Bank Limited cricketers
Sargodha cricketers
Cricketers from Lahore
Lahore City cricketers